This is a list of editors-in-chief of the largest newspapers in Canada by circulation.

Calgary Herald

The Gazette (Montreal)
 Mark Harrison (1977–1989)
 Norman Webster (1989–1993)
 Joan Fraser (1993–1996)
 Alan Allnutt (1996–2000)
 Peter Stockland (2000–2004)
 Andrew Phillips (2004–2009)
 Raymond Brassard (2010–2013)
 Lucinda Chodan (2013–present)

The Globe and Mail
 George McCullagh (1936–1952)
 Oakley Dalgleish (1952–1963)
 R. Howard Webster 1963–1965
 James L. Cooper (1965–1974)
 Richard S. Malone (1974–1978) 
 Richard Doyle (1978–1983)
 Norman Webster (1983–1989)
 William Thorsell (1989–1999)
 Richard Addis (1999–2002)
 Edward Greenspon (2002–2009)
 John Stackhouse (2009–2014)
 David Walmsley (2014–present)

Le Journal de Montréal
 André Lecompte (1964–?)
 Paule Beaugrand-Champagne
 Lyne Robitaille

National Post
 Kenneth Whyte (1998–2003)
 Matthew Fraser (2003–2005)
 Doug Kelly (2005–2010)
 Stephen Meurice (2010–present)

Ottawa Citizen
 Charles Herbert Mackintosh (1874–1892)
 Hugh Clark 1897–1898
 Edward Whipple Bancroft Morrison (1898–1913)
 Keith Spicer (1985–1989)
 Gordon Fisher (1989–1991)
 James Travers (1991–1996)
 Neil Reynolds (1996–2000)
 Scott Keir Anderson (2000–2007)
 Gerry Nott (2009–present)

La Presse
 William-Edmond Blumhart
 Guy Crevier (2001)
 Philippe Cantin
 André Pratte (2001–present)

The Province

Toronto Star
 Joseph E. Atkinson (1899–1948)
 Harry Comfort Hindmarsh (1948–1955)
 Beland Honderich (1955–1966)
 Peter Newman (1969–1971)
 Robert Nielsen (acting 1971)
 Martin Goodman (1971–1978)
 Denis Harvey (1978–1981)
 George Radwanski (1981–1985)
 Fred Kuntz (2006–2008)
 Giles Gherson (2004–2006)
 Michael Cooke (2009–present)

Toronto Sun
 Peter Worthington (1971–1982), editor until 1976; no editor-in-chief previously
 Barbara Amiel (1983–1985)
 John Downing (1985–1997), with the title of editor; there was no editor-in-chief until 1995
 Peter O'Sullivan (1995–1999)
 Mike Strobel (1999–2001)
 Mike Therien (2001–2004)
 Jim Jennings (2004–2006)
 Glenn Garnett (2007)
 Lou Clancy (2007–2009)
 James Wallace (2009–2013)
 Wendy Metcalfe (2013–2015)
 Adrienne Batra (2015–present)

The Vancouver Sun
 Neil Reynolds (2000–2003)
 Patricia Graham (2003–present)

Winnipeg Free Press
 William Fisher Luxton (1872–1893)
 Frederick Molyneux St. John (1893–1895)
 Arnott James Magurn (1898–1901)
 John Wesley Dafoe (1901–1944)
 George Victor Ferguson (1944–1946)
 Grant Dexter (1946–1954)
 Thomas Worrall Kent (1954–1959)
 Shane MacKay (1959–1967)
 Richard S. Malone (1967–1974)
 Peter McLintock (1974–1979)
 John Dafoe (1979–1993)
 Duncan McMonagle (1993–1996)
 Nicholas Hirst (1996–2005)
 Bob Cox (2005–2007)
 Margo Goodhand (2007–2012)
 Paul Samyn (2012–present)

See also
 List of newspapers in Canada

Editors-in-chief
 List